Clumsy Ninja is an action-adventure video game for iOS and Android, developed and published by NaturalMotion in 2013. In the game the player trains a ninja by having them complete tasks in order to gain experience points. Within its first week of release, Clumsy Ninja was downloaded more than 10 million times.

Story
The story is told from 3rd person perspective by the ninja clue book. The main aim of the game is to save Clumsy Ninja's training partner & friend Kira from Hori-Bull, the antagonist, whose main aim is to find the Dragon Medallion. Kira finds the Dragon Medallion before Hori, but loses it as Hori-Bull weakened her, told in storyline. Hori-Bull had slipped a jelly potion, which makes limbs useless, into Kira's stew at one point, then threw her sword in the river, locked her in a cart, and took the Dragon Medallion. He then traveled to the temple region, bringing Kira with him. Kira managed to write a warning on one of her diary pages and give it to her squirrel friend, who soon brought it to Clumsy and friends. Clumsy Ninja, Lily, the chicken, the squirrel and the Sensei arrive to the temple environment/area to find Kira and save her from Hori-Bull. Clumsy, with the others, also find Kira's sword. They presently unlock the dojo, only to find Kira and Hori-Bull as stone statues. Upon freeing the duo, a fight ensues. Clumsy deflects an attack from Hori-Bull and catches the Dragon Medallion in mid-air, ultimately “leveling up” and becomes the Dragon Medallion Keeper, earning his Master Suit. Additionally, Kira manages to land a hit on Hori-Bull, knocking off his helmet. Hori escapes though, leaving his helmet behind while the others are reuniting.

Gameplay
Gameplay centers around training the ninja and improving their "ninja skills". The player can train the ninja by doing certain activities such as: playing hide and seek, playing on the trampoline, training with a punching bag and many other activities to earn experience (xp). As the ninja improves his skills he earns new belts. Another big part of the game is traveling the country and completing quests, doing so will unlock new items that can be used to further train the ninja, along with more storyline details.

Development
Clumsy Ninja is the first mobile game to use the Euphoria physics engine. The game was originally announced for 'holiday season' 2012, however it was delayed by almost a year. It eventually appeared worldwide on the App Store on 21 November 2013. On release, Clumsy Ninja became the first app to be promoted with a video trailer embedded in the App Store.

Reception

The game received "generally favorable reviews" according to the review aggregation website Metacritic. TouchArcade said, "NaturalMotion has created something very impressive and they clearly want to show off their little ninja and what he can do..."

Clumsy Ninja received 10 million downloads as of December 2013.

See also
List of ninja video games
Procedural animation

References

2013 video games
Action-adventure games
Android (operating system) games
IOS games
Japan in non-Japanese culture
NaturalMotion games
Video games about ninja
Video games developed in the United Kingdom